Andaman and Nicobar Football Association (ANFA) is the state governing body of football in Andaman and Nicobar Islands. It is affiliated with the All India Football Federation, the national governing body.

References

Football in the Andaman and Nicobar Islands
Football governing bodies in India